is the title of a 1980s mecha anime television series that was popular during its broadcast between 1981 and 1982 in Japan, Hong Kong and Italy. The series consists of 64 episodes and 2 special presentations. Other loosely translated names are "Hexademon Symbiote God Mars", "Six God Union God Mars", and "Six Gods United As One Being"; sometimes spelling the title mecha as "Godmars".

This television mecha-genre anime is loosely based on the 1976 Mars manga from Shōnen Champion magazine by Mitsuteru Yokoyama. God Mars is named as such to represent the mythological Roman God of war.

Plot
1999 - humanity begins to advance beyond the known Solar System. The small planet Gishin, led by Emperor Zul, who aims to conquer the galaxy, runs into conflict with Earth which he targets for elimination and to do this, he sends a male baby named Mars to live among humanity. Accompanying the baby is a giant robot named Gaia, which utilizes a new power source strong enough to destroy an entire planet. As planned, Mars is expected to grow up, where he will activate the bomb within Gaia to fulfill the mission of destroying the Earth. However, when Mars arrives on Earth he is adopted into a Japanese family and renamed Takeru. 17 years later after arrival, Takeru matures with a love for humanity and refuses to detonate the bomb as ordered by his sender, Zul. However, if Takeru was to die, the bomb within Gaia would explode destroying Earth.

Takeru possesses psychic powers (ESP) and also pilots the series' title super robot with mentality. He decides to join the Earth defense forces and becomes a member of the Crasher Squad (an elite space-defense force) where he and the friends he makes in his life on Earth take a last stand against his true home world Gishin's attack. The relationship of Takeru with his brother Marg, which as fate would have it, pits them against each other in the war.

Unknown to the Gishin, five other mecha were created in secrecy alongside and then sent with Gaia by Takeru's father...
 Sphinx
 Uranus
 Titan
 Shin
 Ra
...to safeguard his boy. Whenever Earth is in danger, Takeru is able to summon the five other secretly created units to combine with Gaia to assemble the title Six-God Combination God Mars. The five other robots are Sphinx, Uranus, Titan, Shin and Ra.

Cast

Staff
 Original author and creator: Mitsuteru Yokoyama
 Series director: Tetsuo Imazawa
 Producer: Atsushi Shimizu, Shigeru Akagawa, Toru Horikoshi, Yasuji Takahashi
 Character design: Hideyuki Motohashi
 Animation director: Hideyuki Motohashi
 Music: Kei Wakakusa
 Mecha design: Hajime Kamegaki
 Background art: Tsutomu Ishigaki
 Narration: Eiji Kanie

Media

Film
A compilation theatrical feature was released in 1982 called God Mars: The Movie.

Original video animation
Later in 1988 (6 years after the television series' final airing in 1982), an OVA was released under the title God Mars: The Untold Legend which focused on the life of Marg, Mars' twin brother. Gaia, God Mars, and the Gishin's robot Zeron receive redesigns although the OVA mostly focuses on an alternate telling of Marg's life on Gishin up until the events of the series' 19th television episode.

Video games
God Mars would go on to make guest appearances in games like entries of the Super Robot Wars series. In Destiny and Z2: Hakai-hen, the player gets a "Game Over" whenever God Mars is destroyed, due to the God Mars storyline for the first 25 episodes with a special game-over screen only in 'Z2: Hakai-hen for when this happens.

Home media
Discotek Media announced its license to the series and its post-television presentations at Otakon 2018 on August 12 and the entire series was released on a SDBD 2-disc set on December 18 - throughout the included discs combined, it contained the series, the movie and the OVA.

Reception
God Mars came out very early in the super-robot animation era of the 1980s, having been created by Mitsuteru Yokoyama and did very well in airing. In 1982 it won the Anime Grand Prix.

References

 Ishizuki, Saburo. Alt, Matt. Duban, Robert. Brisko Tim [2005] (2005). Super #1 Robot: Japanese Robot Toys 1972-1982. San Francisco, CA: Chronicle Books LLC. 
 Clements, Jonatha. McCarthy Helen. [2006] (2006). The Anime Encyclopedia: Revised & Expanded Edition. Berkeley, CA: Stone Bridge Press.

External links
TMS Godmars Library  

1981 anime television series debuts
1982 anime films
1988 anime films
1981 Japanese television series debuts
1982 Japanese television series endings
Alien invasions in television
Discotek Media
Shōnen manga
Super robot anime and manga
Television series set in 1999
TMS Entertainment